The following details the Spain national football team records.

Individual records

Player records

Nationwide
Most hat-tricks scored: 3 – Fernando Torres & David Villa
Most consecutive games with at least one goal: 6 – David Villa
Top scorer in World Cup finals: 9 – David Villa
Most goals scored in one World Cup: 5 – Emilio Butragueño (1986) & David Villa (2010)
Most consecutive matches scored in at World Cup: 4 – David Villa (2010)
Top scorer in European Championship finals: 6 – Álvaro Morata
Most goals scored in one European Championship: 4 – David Villa (2008)
Top scorer in Confederations Cup finals: 8 – Fernando Torres
Most goals scored in one Confederations Cup: 5 – Fernando Torres (2013)
Top scorer in UEFA Nations League finals: 6 – Ferran Torres
Most goals scored in one UEFA Nations League: 6 – Ferran Torres (2020–21)

Most caps

As of 1 December 2022, the players with the most caps for Spain are:

 Bold denotes players still active at international level for the national team.

Most goals

As of 1 December 2022, the ten highest scorers for Spain are:

 Bold denotes players still active at international level for the national team.

Most assists

As of 14 June 2021, the highest assist-providers for Spain are:

 Bold denotes players still active at international level for the national team.
These are Opta defined assists.

Most penalty goals

As of 29 March 2022.

 Bold denotes players still active at international level for the national team.

Hat-tricks
As of 17 November 2020.

 4 Player scored 4 goals
 5 Player scored 5 goals
 6 Player scored 6 goals

Manager records 
 Most manager appearances
 Vicente del Bosque: 114

Team records

Worldwide
World Cup winners: 2010
Most consecutive wins including friendlies: 15 (2008–09)
Most consecutive wins achieved by an international coach from debut: 13 – Vicente del Bosque
Longest unbeaten run: 36 matches (2007–09)
Longest streak without conceding a goal: 9 matches (1992–93)

Biggest wins

Heaviest defeats
Scores from 4–0 and up

FIFA Rankings
Last update was on 14 November 2021.  
Source:

References

 
National association football team records and statistics